The Nyuya (Ñüüye) is a river in Sakha, Russia. It is a left tributary of the Lena.

Course  
The Nyuya has its source in the Lena Plateau and flows south of the course of the Peleduy. The Nyuya freezes up in the second half of October and stays icebound until May. In its lower course it flows to the west of the Derba as it reaches the Lena floodplain and flows slowly in a swampy area. Finally it meets the Lena  from its mouth.

Tributaries
Its main tributaries are the rivers Tympychan, Khamaky, Ulakhan-Murbayy, Ochchuguy-Murbayy, and Betinche.

See also
List of rivers of Russia

References

External links 

Rivers of the Sakha Republic